Orso Paolo Bertolucci (born December 12, 1936) is a French singer-songwriter. Known professionally as Michel Orso (pronunciation= Orso), he is best known in for his 1966 French hit song "Angélique".

Early life
Orso was born in Prunelli-di-Casacconi, a mountain village on the northeastern side of the Mediterranean island of Corsica, a regional department of France with strong historical and cultural ties to Italy. His father died before his birth and he was separated from his destitute mother, growing up in an orphanage during and just after World War Two. He performed as a soloist in the choir of the orphanage and was recruited to sing Vespers in Corsican churches.

Leaving the orphanage as a teenager he was reunited with his mother, supporting her while working during the day as a baker, butcher, and mason, and singing in the evening at parties and with friends. Eventually he was invited to perform at local weddings, baptisms, and communions, and entered regional amateur singing competitions. In his early twenties Orso decided to leave Corsica for the French capital Paris to pursue a professional singing career. There he sang with several orchestras and was eventually hired to tour the south of France with Adamo, Eddy Mitchell, and Enrico Macias.

Commercial breakthrough
In 1966, he wrote and recorded the 45 RPM single Angélique. French radio stations introduced the song and it became a wild success, selling 300,000 copies in just a few weeks. Orso acknowledges that this song was the key turning point in his life and career. He also wrote the minor French hits Ma vérité c'est toi (You are My Truth), Le veston à carreaux, (The Plaid Jacket), L'enfant de la rue (The Street Child) and L'ami tu nous reviens (The Friend Who Came Back).

Comeback
In the early 1970s, Orso began a period of relative commercial obscurity which would last 35 years. In 2006, he toured France with a show dedicated to his long-time idol, singer-songwriter Gilbert Bécaud.  Since then he is the only performer to have participated in all of the very popular, annually held 60's and 70's nostalgia reviews Âge tendre, la tournée des idols (Tender Age, the tour of idols) – formerly called  Âge tendre et têtes de bois (Tender age and wooden heads, a popular song by Bécaud).  As of 2015 Michel Orso still performs regularly, occasionally alongside friend and musician François Grimaldi at the Corsican restaurant-cabaret Le Lamarck in Paris' Montmartre district.

Discography
 Angélique
 Mon veston à carreaux
 Un sourire qui en disait long
 Le globe trotter
 Ma vérité
 La mouette
 Moitié-Moitié
 Pochette surprise
 Sans toi
 Chanson pour ma muse
 La mouette
 Du temps de mes 42 ans
 Ces enfants là
 Marie–Juliette
 Ce petit bout
 De souvenir
 La marchand de pluie
 Hier, c'était pour rien
 L'oiseau du voyage
 Belle la vie est belle
 J'ai des larmes dans les yeux
 Chanson pour vous
 Toi et moi
 Au soleil de Vincent Scotto
 On a bien raison de croire
 Ce sera notre été

External links
 Official Web Site
 Official Fan Club
 Site officiel de la tournée Âge tendre & Têtes de bois

French singer-songwriters
1936 births
Living people